Victoria Albertovna Demchenko (born 26 November 1995) is a Russian luger. She is the daughter of Albert Demchenko, who is also her coach.

Demchenko's best results to date came in the 2018–19 season, finishing thrice in the top three. In the Königssee stage she had a heavy crash, after which she was taken to the hospital and released after only having a minor concussion. She won her first World Cup title in the Sochi stage in sprint.

World Cup podiums

References

External links

1995 births
Living people
People from Chusovoy
Russian female lugers
Lugers at the 2012 Winter Youth Olympics
Lugers at the 2022 Winter Olympics
Olympic lugers of Russia
Sportspeople from Perm Krai